Zoran Jovičić (Serbian Cyrillic: Зоран Joвичић; born 17 April 1973) is a Serbian retired footballer who played as a forward.

References

External links
 Profile at reprezentacija.rs

1973 births
Living people
Footballers from Belgrade
Serbian footballers
Serbia and Montenegro international footballers
FK Sutjeska Nikšić players
FK Borac Banja Luka players
Red Star Belgrade footballers
U.C. Sampdoria players
Serie A players
Serie B players
Expatriate footballers in Italy
Ligue 1 players
Ligue 2 players
Stade Malherbe Caen players
Expatriate footballers in France
Super League Greece players
Football League (Greece) players
Panionios F.C. players
Expatriate footballers in Greece
Association football forwards
Serbia and Montenegro expatriate footballers
Serbia and Montenegro footballers
Serbia and Montenegro expatriate sportspeople in Italy
Serbia and Montenegro expatriate sportspeople in France
Serbia and Montenegro expatriate sportspeople in Greece